Lavar-e Sofla (also Romanized as Lāvar-e Soflá; also known as Lāvar) is a village in Deh Tall Rural District, in the Central District of Bastak County, Hormozgan Province, Iran. At the 2006 census, its population was 31, in 4 families.

References 

Populated places in Bastak County